The 2016 Continental Cycling Championships covers all road and off-road cycling disciplines split by their respective Continental confederation.

African continental champions

American continental champions

Asian continental champions

European continental champions

Oceanian continental champions

See also
Oceania Cycling Championships
African Continental Cycling Championships

References

Continental
Continental cycling championships